Muntz (or Müntz) is a surname. Notable people with the surname include:

Muntz 

 George Frederic Muntz (1794–1857), industrialist and MP from Birmingham, England
 Muntz metal, an alloy which he invented
 Philip Henry Muntz, his brother, also an MP
 Sir Philip Muntz, 1st Baronet, his son
 See also Muntz Baronets

 H. M. Muntz (1800s), musician and collector from Birmingham, England
 Muntz Stradivarius, an antique violin
 Alan Muntz (1899–1985), British consulting aeronautical engineer
 Earl "Madman" Muntz (1914–1987), merchandiser of cars and consumer electronics, electrical engineer
 Muntz Car Company
 Muntz Stereo-Pak
 Muntzing, removing excess components of an electronic appliance
 Laura Muntz Lyall (1860–1930), Canadian impressionist painter
 (born 1963), Dutch comedian
 Rolf Muntz (born 1969), Dutch golfer
 Nelson Muntz, fictional character on The Simpsons
Charles Muntz, main antagonist of Up

Müntz 
 Eugène Müntz (1845-1902), Alsace-born art historian
 Herman Müntz, Polish-Jewish mathematician
 Müntz–Szász theorem (1884-1952)

See also 
 Munz (disambiguation)
 Mintz
 Minz

German-language surnames
Jewish surnames